Double Bass is a studio album by jazz bassists Niels-Henning Ørsted Pedersen and Sam Jones, which was recorded in 1976 and released on the Danish SteepleChase label.

Reception

In his review for AllMusic, Ken Dryden said "Both bassists had played with the formidable pianist Oscar Peterson, so they not only knew something about playing rhythm but were very potent soloists to boot. Pedersen's singing tone contrasts with the darker sound of Jones, though the players nimbly shift roles throughout the sessions. ...This fun date was evidently the only time Niels-Henning Ørsted Pedersen and Sam Jones had the opportunity to work together, but they made the most of it".

Track listing
 "Falling in Love With Love" (Lorenz Hart, Richard Rodgers) - 6:20
 "A Notion" (Albert Heath) - 5:38
 "Giant Steps" (John Coltrane) - 3:43
 "I Fall in Love Too Easily" (Jule Styne, Sammy Cahn) - 6:16
 "Miss Morgan" (Sam Jones) - 6:17
 "Au Privave" (Charlie Parker) - 5:44
 "Yesterdays" (Jerome Kern, Otto Harbach) - 4:59
 "Little Train" (Heitor Villa-Lobos) - 5:20
 "A Notion" [Alternate Take] (Heath) - 5:10 Bonus track on CD reissue
 "Miss Morgan" [Alternate Take] (Jones) - 5:58 Bonus track on CD reissue

Personnel
Niels-Henning Ørsted Pedersen, Sam Jones - bass 
Philip Catherine - guitar
Billy Higgins - drums
Albert Heath - percussion (tracks 2, 4, 8 & 9)

References 

1976 albums
Niels-Henning Ørsted Pedersen albums
Sam Jones (musician) albums
SteepleChase Records albums